Chirixalus is a genus of frogs in the moss frog family (Rhacophoridae). Formerly used to classify Asian species of Chiromantis and later synonymized with that genus, it was removed from synonymy and resurrected in 2020.

Species
The following species are now recognised in the genus Chirixalus:
 Chirixalus cherrapunjiae (Roonwal and Kripalani, 1966)
 Chirixalus doriae Boulenger, 1893
 Chirixalus dudhwaensis Ray, 1992
 Chirixalus nongkhorensis (Cochran, 1927)
Chirixalus pantaiselatan (Munir, Hamidy, Kusrini, Kennedi, Ridha, Qayyim, Rafsanzani, and Nishikawa, 2021)
 Chirixalus simus Annandale, 1915
 Chirixalus trilaksonoi (Riyanto and Kurniati, 2014)

References

 
Rhacophoridae
Amphibians of Asia
Amphibian genera
Taxa named by George Albert Boulenger